Geneviève Lacasse (born May 5, 1989) is a Canadian ice hockey goaltender currently playing for the Montréal section of the PWHPA. She is also a member of the Canada women's national ice hockey team with whom she has won gold medals at both the Olympic Games and IIHF World Championships. In the Canadian Women's Hockey League, she is a two-time Clarkson Cup winner. Lacasse was born in Montreal, Quebec, but grew up in Kingston, Ontario.

Education
Lacasse attended many high schools. In order of attendance: École Secondaire Catholique Marie-Rivier in Kingston, Ontario, College Charles-Lemoyne in Ville Ste-Catherine Quebec, École secondaire de Mortagne in Boucherville Quebec, Kingston Collegial and Vocational Institute in Kingston, Ontario, Lake Forest Academy Chicago, and graduated from Marian High School Detroit. Thereafter, she enrolled at Providence College where she completed her first degree.  Presently she is studying for a master in Marketing.

Playing career
Lacasse won a bronze medal with the Kingston Ice Wolves at the OWHA provincial championship (Midget AA) in 2005. In 2007–08, Lacasse competed for Detroit Little Caesars (Midget AAA), and won a silver medal at the 2008 USA Nationals.

Providence
On October 29, 2010, Lacasse stopped 40 shots in a 2–2 tie against No. 5 Boston University, including three in overtime. The goalie made several quality saves, including on a partial breakaway in the first period by Terrier Jenn Wakefield. She stopped 14 shots in the opening period and 13 in the third frame.

During October 2010, Lacasse had a 1.64 GAA and a .949 save percentage. These numbers were complemented by two shutouts. In addition, she accumulated a league-high 281 saves. In two games, she had over 40 saves. For the week beginning January 14, 2011, Lacasse made a total of 86 saves (.977 save%) in wins against No. 7 Boston College and No. 9 Northeastern. On January 19, she matched a career-best 51 stops against the Eagles at Schneider Arena. The Friars penalty kill was a perfect 7-for-7 during the two matches. On March 5, 2011, Lacasse would break the record set by Florence Schelling earlier in the day for most saves in a Hockey East tournament game with 58.

On January 28 and 29, 2012, Lacasse stopped 51 of 53 shots in a Friars sweep of the Connecticut Huskies. With the two victories, Lacasse surpassed Jana Bugden as the Friars all-time wins leader with 59. Her shutout on January 28 was the 17th of her Friars career, a new record. On Friday, February 17, 2012, Providence skated to a 0–0 tie against the #7 Northeastern Huskies. The Friars have clinched at least fourth-place in the Hockey East standings, with home ice advantage for quarterfinal play. Both goaltenders, Genevieve Lacasse of Providence and Florence Schelling of Northeastern stopped 80 shots combined through three periods and overtime. Lacasse stopped 42 shots while Schelling logged 38 stops. With the shutout, Lacasse earned the 18th of her NCAA career, a Providence school record.

Following the 2012 Hockey East tournament, Lacasse was named to the All-Tournament Team after playing over 179 minutes of playoff hockey without allowing a goal. Upon graduation, Lacasse set Providence College recordsin four categories. Said categories included: victories (64), games (127), saves (3,482) and shutouts (20).

Hockey Canada
Lacasse was named to Canada's 2014 Olympic roster. In the 2011 MLP Cup, Lacasse earned a shutout in a 5–0 defeat of Switzerland on January 4. Prior to the match, she had made 57 consecutive starts for the Friars. Lacasse earned a shutout in the gold medal game of the 2011 MLP Cup, as Canada prevailed over Sweden by a 6–0 mark. In the third game of the 2011 IIHF Eight Nations Tournament, Lacasse earned a shutout in an 11–0 triumph over Slovakia. By being named to the Team Canada roster for the 2012 IIHF Women's Worlds, Lacasse became the 19th skater from Providence to compete in the World Championships, while being the first to dress for Team Canada.

Boston Blades
During the 2012–13 CWHL season, Lacasse was the regular season goaltending champion. For her efforts, she would win the CWHL Most Outstanding Goaltender Award. In the postseason, she would help the Boston Blades become the 2013 Clarkson Cup champions.

On August 27, 2016, the Calgary Inferno acquired Lacasse from the Boston Blades, completing the trade that sent Tara Watchorn to the Blades in the summer of 2014.

Les Canadiennes de Montreal 
On July 12, 2018, Lacasse was acquired by Les Canadiennes de Montreal, along with forward Jillian Saulnier.

Awards and honours
Hockey East rookie of the year in 2008–09
Hockey East Second All-Star Team in 2008–09
Hockey East All-Rookie Team in 2008–09
Hockey East Co-Defensive Player of the Week (Week of November 1, 2010)
Hockey East Goaltender of the Month (October 2010)
Hockey East Player of the Week (Week of January 24, 2011)
Hockey East Defensive Player of the Week (Week of February 14)
Runner-up, Hockey East Goaltender of the Month (December 2010)
2011 Providence Team MVP
Providence Hockey East All-Decade Team
Hockey East Defensive Player of the Week (Week of January 31, 2011) 
2012 New England Hockey Writer's All-Star selection
2012 Hockey East Second-Team All-Star
2012 Hockey East All-Tournament team

CWHL
2014–15 CWHL Second All-Star Team
2013 Clarkson Cup Top Goaltender
2013 Clarkson Cup All-Star Team
2012–13 CWHL Goaltender of the Year Award
2012–13 CWHL First All-Star Team
2012–13 CWHL All-Rookie Team

References

External links

1989 births
Boston Blades players
Canadian expatriate ice hockey players in the United States
Calgary Inferno players
Canadian women's ice hockey goaltenders
Clarkson Cup champions
French Quebecers
Ice hockey people from Ontario
Ice hockey players at the 2014 Winter Olympics
Ice hockey players at the 2018 Winter Olympics
Lake Forest Academy alumni
Living people
Medalists at the 2014 Winter Olympics
Medalists at the 2018 Winter Olympics
Olympic gold medalists for Canada
Olympic ice hockey players of Canada
Olympic medalists in ice hockey
Olympic silver medalists for Canada
Professional Women's Hockey Players Association players
Providence Friars women's ice hockey players
Sportspeople from Kingston, Ontario
Ice hockey people from Montreal